Boom Chicka Boom is the 76th album by American country music singer Johnny Cash, released in 1990 on Mercury Records. The title refers to the sound that Cash's backing band, the Tennessee Three, were said to produce. It includes a cover of Harry Chapin's "Cat's in the Cradle", and a song written by Elvis Costello for Cash, "Hidden Shame". "Don't Go Near the Water" is a re-recorded version and its original had been recorded for Ragged Old Flag.  It discusses the issue of pollution of the environment. In 2003, Mercury released Boom Chicka Boom paired with Johnny Cash is Coming to Town on a single compact disc, though the bonus track "Veteran's Day" was left off. "Farmer's Almanac" and "Cat's in the Cradle" were released as singles, but failed to chart; the album itself, however, reached No. 48 on the country charts. The album has backing vocals by Elvis Presley's old backing group The Jordanaires (who had also backed Cash on some of his earliest Columbia recordings in the late 1950s), and Cash's mother.

Track listing

Personnel 
Johnny Cash - vocals, guitar
W.S. Holland - drums
Bob Moore, Roy Huskey, Jr. - bass guitar 
Joe Zinkan - upright bass
Reggie Young, Billy Sanford, Jim Soldi - electric guitar
Ray Edenton - acoustic guitar
Hargus "Pig" Robbins, Earl Ball - piano
The Jordanaires - background vocals
Mrs. Carrie Cash (Johnny Cash's mother) - additional vocals on "Family Bible"

Additional personnel
Produced By: Bob Moore
Recorded at Bradley's Barn in Mt. Juliet, Tennessee and Stargem Recording Studio in Nashville, Tennessee
Mixed at Bradley's Barn
Engineers: Bobby Bradley, Dennis Ritchie
Assistant Engineer: Danny Dunkleberger
Mastered by: Benny Quinn at Masterfonics, Inc. in Nashville, Tennessee
Original CD Graphics: Barnes & Company
Art Direction & Design: Bill Barnes
Photography: Alan Messer
Reissue CD Credits
Supervised by: Andy McKaie
Digitally Remastered by Suha Gur, universal Mastering - East
Art Direction: Vartan
Design: Mike Fink @ilevel
Photo Research: Ryan Null
Photos by: Slick Lawson and Alan Messer
Production Coordination: Beth Stempel

Charts
Album - Billboard (United States)

References

External links
 LP Discography entry on Boom Chicka Boom
 Bob Moore site's BCB webpage

Johnny Cash albums
1990 albums
Mercury Nashville albums
Albums produced by Bob Moore